Fire-and-forget is a type of missile guidance which does not require further external intervention after launch such as illumination of the target or wire guidance, and can hit its target without the launcher being in line-of-sight of the target.  This is an important property for a guided weapon to have, since a person or vehicle that lingers near the target to guide the missile (using, for instance, a laser designator) is vulnerable to attack and unable to carry out other tasks.

Generally, information about the target is programmed into the missile just prior to launch. This can include coordinates, radar measurements (including velocity), or an infrared image of the target. After it is fired, the missile guides itself by some combination of gyroscopes and accelerometers, GPS, onboard active radar homing, and infrared homing optics. Some systems offer the option of either continued input from the launch platform or fire-and-forget.

Fire-and-forget missiles can be vulnerable to soft-kill systems on modern main battle tanks, in addition to existing hard-kill systems. As opposed to unguided RPGs which require a hard-kill system (a counter projectile(s) used to destroy the incoming missile), fire-and-forget missiles can often be jammed by means such as electro-optical dazzlers.

Examples
Many of these are infrared homing missiles; some of the remainder (e.g. AIM-120) are active radar guided.

 AGM-84H/K SLAM-ER
 AAM-4 (Type 99 AAM)
 AASM HAMMER (SBU-38, -54, -64)
 Akeron MP
 AGM-65 Maverick
 AGM-84 Harpoon
 AGM-114L Longbow Hellfire
 AIM-9 Sidewinder
 AIM-54 Phoenix
 AIM-120 AMRAAM
 Akash missile
 CITEFA AS-25K
 Astra missile
 Brimstone
 Brahmos Supersonic Land Attack Missile
 EXACTO
 AM39 Exocet
 FGM-148 Javelin
 FIM-92 Stinger
 Firestreak (1959–1988; British tail-chase infrared AAM fitted to Sea Vixen, Javelin, Lightning.)
 Hermes (missile)
 Sosna-R
 HJ-9A
 IRIS-T
 Kh-25 (Soviet Union)
 Kh-29D
 Kh-35
 Kh-59
 LFK NG
 MICA
 Nag
 PARS 3 LR
 PL-12
 RBS 15
 Red Dean (1950s British active-radar AAM. Early trial firings only; cancelled before service entry.)
 Red Top (1964–1988; British all-aspect infrared-homing missile fitted to Sea Vixen and Lightning.)
 Roketsan UMTAS
 RIM-66 Standard SM2, blocks IIIB and IVA only
 RIM-174 Standard ERAM
 Spike (missile)
 SRAW Predator Antitank Missile
 Type 01 LMAT
 TUBITAK-SAGE SOM (missile) (Turkey)
 Vympel R-27
 Vympel R-73
 Vympel R-77
 FN-6
 Kornet-EM
 9M123 Khrizantema
 9K333 Verba
 P-800 Oniks
 3M-54 Kalibr
 Skif (ATGM)
 Shershen
 HJ-12
 Nag/Prospina
 Raybolt

See also
 Precision-guided munition
 Command guided

References

Missile guidance
Weapon guidance